Ushi Khan was an Indian politician. She was a Member of Parliament, representing Rajasthan in the Rajya Sabha the upper house of India's Parliament as a member of the INC.

References

1935 births
2014 deaths
Rajya Sabha members from Rajasthan
Indian National Congress politicians from Rajasthan
Women in Rajasthan politics
Women members of the Rajya Sabha